
Gmina Ceranów is a rural gmina (administrative district) in Sokołów County, Masovian Voivodeship, in east-central Poland.

Villages
Gmina Ceranów contains the villages and settlements of Adolfów, Ceranów, Długie Grodzieckie, Długie Grzymki, Długie Kamieńskie, Garnek, Lubiesza, Natolin, Noski, Olszew, Przewóz Nurski, Pustelnik, Radość, Rytele Suche, Rytele-Olechny, Rytele-Wszołki, Wólka Nadbużna, Wólka Rytelska, Wszebory and Zawady.

Neighbouring gminas
Gmina Ceranów is bordered by the gminas of Kosów Lacki, Małkinia Górna, Nur, Sterdyń and Zaręby Kościelne.

References

Polish official population figures 2006

Ceranow
Sokołów County